Nikolay Nikolayevich Leonov (born 1 November 1955) is a Russian professional association football official and a former player.

Club career
He spent one season in 1980 in the Soviet Top League for FC Lokomotiv Moscow.

External links
 

1955 births
Sportspeople from Yekaterinburg
Living people
Soviet footballers
Association football goalkeepers
FC Uralets Nizhny Tagil players
FC Ural Yekaterinburg players
FC Lokomotiv Moscow players
FC Metalist Kharkiv players
FC Spartak Tambov players
FC Dnepr Mogilev players
FK Andijon players
FC Torpedo Zaporizhzhia players
FC Nyva Vinnytsia players
Soviet Top League players